Bojan Gorišek (born June 6, 1962) is a Slovenian pianist.

Education and career
Gorišek studied under the tutelage of Aci Bertoncelj at the Academy of Music of the University of Ljubljana, from which he graduated in 1986. He later studied in Cologne. His concert repertoire primarily consists of works by 20th and 21st-century composers. Among his recordings is the entire piano opus of Erik Satie. He has also premiered works by Slovenian composers such as Milko Lazar.

As of 2019, Gorišek has been interpreting works by American composer Philip Glass.

Awards
 Župančič Award, 2019
 Prešeren Award, 2006

See also
List of Slovenian musicians

References

External links
 Official website
 

1962 births
Living people
Slovenian classical pianists